MV Queen of Coquitlam is a  in the BC Ferries fleet, launched in 1976. She first operated on BC Ferries' Horseshoe Bay to Departure Bay route. For most of her life, she has been a replacement/relief vessel on all the major routes serving Metro Vancouver. She is named for the city of Coquitlam.

This ship has the distinction of being the only BC Ferries vessel to have issued a mayday from dry dock when, during a 1980 maintenance layover, she tipped in the Burrard Shipyards drydock, causing approximately CAD $3 million in damage. In November 2002, she started a major rehabilitation that would extend her service life by another 20 years. The refurbishment, costing CAD $18 million, improved her passenger services with some minor work to her engineering. Additionally, over 100 tonnes of steel was either added or replaced, and four evacuation stations were installed. She returned to service by June 2003.

Upon return, Queen of Coquitlam started regular service on Horseshoe Bay-Departure Bay route. Queen of Oak Bay, which had a similar refit to Queen of Coquitlam, displaced her from her route in the early Summer 2005. She currently operates as a secondary vessel on Langdale - Horseshoe Bay in the summer, as well as a replacement vessel for any of the other C class or Super C-class vessels when they are sent for refitting.

Statistics

Length: 139.29 m (457 ft)
Beam (width): 27 m (89 ft)
Decks ASL: 6
Draught (depth): 6 m (20 ft)
Tonnage: 6,551.18
Engines: 2 × MaK 12M551AK 6,000 hp (4.5 MW) each maximum
Power 11,860 hp (8.84 MW)
Service Speed: 19 to 22 knots (35 to 41 km/h)
Cars: 362
Passengers: 1,466
Crew: 34
Route: Langdale-Horseshoe Bay (summer)

See also
Queen of Cowichan
Queen of Alberni
Queen of Surrey

References

External links
BC Ferries: Queen of Coquitlam
West Coast Ferries: Queen of Coquitlam
YouTube video of the Queen of Coquitlam

C-class ferries
1976 ships
Ships built in British Columbia